Goodbye Killer is a Pernice Brothers album, released in 2010.

Track listing

 "Bechamel" – 2:25
 "Jacqueline Susann" – 2:18
 "We Love the Stage" – 3:25
 "The Loving Kind" – 3:28
 "Something for You" – 4:01
 "Goodbye Killer" – 3:58
 "The Great Depression" – 2:57
 "Newport News" – 3:35
 "Fucking and Flowers" – 2:40
 "The End of Faith" – 3:23

References

Pernice Brothers albums
2010 albums